Annemarie Sylvia Meier (born 19 February 1957) is a German chess player who won the German Women's Chess Championship (2003).

Biography 

Annemarie Meier won the German Women's Chess Championship in Altenkirchen in 2003. She was twice won German Women's Blitz Chess Championship (1996 and 2004) and has won the German  Women's Rapid Chess Championships (1997).

Annemarie Meier played with the Stuttgarter Schachfreunde 1879 in the Chess Women's Bundesliga season 2001/02. At the German Women's State Team Chess Championship in 2008 in Braunfels, she got four points from five games for Württemberg on the first board.

Meier graduated from high school at the age of 17 and, at his father's request, began studying mathematics, which he dropped out of. At the age of 25, Meier had coming out as Transsexual. He played chess in Tübingen until 1980, decided to have sex reassignment surgery in the early 1990s and, after a 15-year break, began playing chess again in 1995, this time in Stuttgart and since then in the women's area.

Annemarie Meier is listed as inactive at FIDE because she has not played an Elo rated game since the 2011/12 season of the 2nd Chess Women's Bundesliga. She achieved a norm for the title Women's International Master (WIM) at the International Women's Chess Tournament in Wangen im Allgäu in 1997.

References

External links 

1957 births
Living people
Sportspeople from Bochum
Transgender sportswomen
German female chess players
German LGBT people